One Night Only may refer to:

Film and television 
 One Night Only (1986 film), a Canadian film featuring Lenore Zann
 One Night Only (2008 film), a Philippine film
 One Night Only (2016 film), a Chinese-Taiwanese romance film
 One Night Only (TV series), a British entertainment show
 TNA One Night Only, a professional wrestling pay-per-view event series
 WWF One Night Only, a professional wrestling pay-per-view event

Music 
 One Night Only (Bee Gees album), 1998
 One Night Only: Live, a 1998 album by Black 'N Blue
 "One Night Only" (song), from the musical Dreamgirls
 Elton John One Night Only – The Greatest Hits, a 2000 live album
 One Night Only: The Greatest Hits Live at Madison Square Garden, a 2000 DVD by Elton John
 One Night Only (Krystal Klear song)
 One Night Only (video), a 1999 video by Ricky Martin
 One Night Only with Ricky Martin, a 2005–2006 tour by Ricky Martin
 One Night Only (band), a British indie rock group
 One Night Only (One Night Only album), 2010
 One Night Only (Pascal & Pearce album)
 One Night Only (The Struts song)
 One Night Only (Thin Lizzy album), 2000
 One Night Only: Barbra Streisand and Quartet at The Village Vanguard, a 2010 DVD by Barbra Streisand

See also
 For One Night Only (disambiguation)
 One Night (disambiguation)